Carey Torrice (born 13 February 1977 in Detroit, Michigan as Carey Shawn Scarlett Valentine DeJaeghere) is a politician from Macomb County, Michigan. In 2007, she was named "Hottest Politician in the USA" by TMZ.com, and was also featured on Inside Edition as "America's Sexiest Politician" in 2008.

Early life
Torrice was born in Detroit, Michigan, United States. She moved to Clinton Township at a young age.  She graduated from Chippewa Valley High School, and obtained an associate degree from Macomb Community College and a BA from Wayne State University.

Her Uncle, Leo Fenn, managed such rock bands as Suzi Quatro's The Pleasure Seekers, Alice Cooper, and The Billion Dollar Babies. Torrice is of Belgian descent on her Father's side, and of Irish and French descent on her Mother's. It has been reported that Carey Torrice has an IQ of 147.

Political career
Torrice was elected in 2006 to the Macomb County Board of Commissioners. She was re-elected to a second term in 2008. During her time in office, Torrice served as the Chairperson of the Public Services Committee and as Chairperson of the Veterans Services Committee. While on the commission, she focused on securing medicine for animals at the Macomb County Animal Shelter and converting the shelter to a no-kill facility, according to her press release. She also worked to support passage of the Veterans Service millage, In honor of her late Father, USMC Sgt. Larry DeJaeghere.

Other work
Torrice has worked both as a licensed private investigator and as an actress.

Torrice has appeared on National TV as an Expert Private Investigator. https://www.macombdaily.com/sports/local-p-i-s-share-cheatin-videos-today-on-maury/article_5fd38c90-180c-5b27-9f85-7615fcfa4e50.html

In addition, she has worked as a model, actress and celebrity private eye and has appeared on various television shows including E! Entertainment's "Holly's World" featuring Playmate Holly Madison. In which she was featured for the entire 2nd season. She is a licensed private investigator who along with her husband, Mike, runs Eye Spy Detective Agency in Fraser.

Torrice was also featured in  New York Times bestselling memoir by ex-Playboy Bunny Holly Madison, Down the Rabbit Hole: Curious Adventures and Cautionary Tales of a Former Playboy Bunny

Filmography 
Silent Scream (2005)
"Gran Torino" (2008)
Annabelle & Bear (2010)
Tetherball (2010)
Holly's World (2011)
Maury Povich
Lost River" (2014)

References

External links 
 Macomb County Board of Commissioners
 Carey Torrice Official Web site

 

County commissioners in Michigan
People from Clinton, Macomb County, Michigan
Macomb Community College alumni
Women in Michigan politics
Living people
1977 births
21st-century American women